This is a list of canceled nuclear reactors and site projects in Russia.

History
Throughout the 1970s and up to the late 1980s, Russia had been rapidly expanding its RBMK reactor program. 18 were originally planned across 3 sites including Kursk, Leningrad and Smolensk. However, in light of the Chernobyl incident in 1986, many of these reactors were either cancelled, or left unfinished. Some of these reactors had significant infrastructure already in place in preparation for construction but were halted as the reactors were seen as very unsafe.

In recent decades, construction was started on reactor projects all across the country using the newer VVER class of reactors. In some cases, complications with supply, export security and a variety of other factors have led to the suspension of construction or even permanent cancellation of these projects entirely.

This list displays the status of these projects and identifies them as cancelled plan; meaning the site never came to fruition, or cancelled construction; meaning facilities were constructed but further advancement was suspended.

Cancelled nuclear reactors

References

Nuclear power in Russia
Cancelled nuclear power stations
Nuclear history